Phlyarus thailandensis is a species of beetle in the family Cerambycidae. It was described by Breuning and Chujo in 1966. It is known from Thailand.

References

Desmiphorini
Beetles described in 1966